Alcha is a rural locality (a settlement) in Krasnoyarsky District, Astrakhan Oblast, Russia. The population was 1,014 as of 2010. There are 18 streets.

Geography 
Alcha is located 7 km north of Krasny Yar (the district's administrative centre) by road. Pervomaysky is the nearest rural locality.

References 

Rural localities in Krasnoyarsky District, Astrakhan Oblast